National Patriotic Front may refer to:

 Front of Patriotic and National Parties (Syria)
 Independent National Patriotic Front of Liberia
 National Patriotic Front of Liberia
 National Patriotic Front of Liberia – Central Revolutionary Council
 National Patriotic Front (Moldova)
 National Patriotic Front (Namibia)
 Patriotic and Democratic Front of the Great National Union of Kampuchea (Cambodia)
National Patriotic Front (Zimbabwe)

Political party disambiguation pages